Lingxia may refer to the following locations in China:

 Lingxia, Jilin, town in Taobei District, Baicheng
 Lingxia, Zhejiang, town in Jindong District, Jinhua
 Lingxia Township, Pingnan County, Fujian

See also 
 Linxia (disambiguation)